The Outstanding Parliamentarian Award is an award given by the Indian Parliamentary Group to an outstanding sitting Member of the Indian Parliament  for overall contribution in the Indian Parliament. It was instituted in 1995 by Shivraj Patil, who was the Speaker of Lok Sabha from 1991 to 1996.

Recipients

Criticism
It has been observed that the award has been awarded in a pattern to senior leaders of major political parties. Questions have been raised on the need, seriousness and authenticity of the exercise to present the ‘Outstanding Parliamentarian Award’.

References

External links

 Parliament of India, official website
 Indian Parliamentary Group winners list

Indian awards
Parliament of India
Awards established in 1995